From March 19 to June 4, 1912, voters of the Democratic Party elected delegates to the 1912 Democratic National Convention for the purpose of choosing a nominee for President in the 1912 election. 

The primaries were inconclusive, with Speaker of the House Champ Clark holding a lead over Woodrow Wilson, but neither candidate close to the two-thirds of the delegates necessary to secure the nomination. In third place, Ohio governor Judson Harmon boasted the support of his home state and New York, the largest single delegation. House Majority Leader Oscar Underwood had strong support from the Deep South but little appeal outside the region.

At the convention, Wilson eventually secured the nomination over Clark after forty back-and-forth ballots.

Candidates

Nominee

Withdrew During Convention

Withdrew During Primaries

Results

See also 
 Republican Party presidential primaries, 1912
White primary

Notes

References